The following is the list of ambassadors and high commissioners to the United Kingdom, or more formally, to the Court of St James's. High commissioners represent member states of the Commonwealth of Nations and ambassadors represent other states. Note that some diplomats are accredited by, or to, more than one country.

Current ambassadors to London

See also
 Foreign relations of the United Kingdom
 List of diplomatic missions of the United Kingdom
 List of diplomatic missions in the United Kingdom

References

External links 
GOV.UK: Foreign embassies in the UK landing page

United Kingdom